Selebar is a small port town on the south-west coast of Sumatra, Indonesia. It is located several kilometres south of Bengkulu City and is noted for its large harbor. Administratively, Selebar forms a districts of Bengkulu province.

References

bengkulu (city)
districts of Bengkulu
Populated places in Bengkulu
Ports and harbours of Indonesia